Podmolje is a village in the municipality of Ohrid, North Macedonia.

Demographics 
According to the national census of 2002, the village had a total of 331 inhabitants. Ethnic groups in the municipality include:
 Macedonians : 325
 Serbs : 2
 Other: 4

References

External links

Villages in Ohrid Municipality